The Adelaide College of the Arts, also known as AC Arts and formerly known as Adelaide Centre for the Arts, is a campus of TAFE South Australia that specialises in performing arts education. It is located on Light Square, Adelaide, and is part of TAFE SA.

Identified major study areas of the centre are:
 Performing Arts (Acting and Dance)
 Visual Arts
 Music Performance and Sound Production
 Graphic Design
 Photography
 Film and Television Production
 CGI and Game Art
 Technical Production

Courses
Adelaide College for the Arts (AC Arts) provides both short and award courses.

Award Courses:
Film and Television Production
Photography and Digital Imaging 
Live Production, Theatre and Events (Technical Operations)
Costume for Performance
Live Production, Theatre and Events (Technical Production)
Scenery and Set Construction
Acting
Design for Live Production, Theatre and Events
Stage Management
Dance
Jewellery
3D Ceramics and Sculpture
Visual Arts
Professional Writing

Campus
AC Arts' purpose built $30 million campus was designed by award winning architect Adrian Evans during his time with the Adelaide-based firm Hassel.

Theatres
AC Arts has two main theatre spaces.  These are used for in house performances and also for professional productions especially during the Adelaide Fringe and the Adelaide Festival.

The 'Main Theatre' is a proscenium arch theatre that seats 220 and the 'X Space' experimental theatre that seats 110.  Both spaces are 'industry-standard' allowing students to learn in an environment as close as possible to the professional world.

Acting and Dance Studios
On the third floor of the building there are four dance studios with mirrors and bars, four acting studios and a music room.  Two of the acting studios (The Stables and the David Kendall Studio) double as performance spaces with easy black out ability.

History
The centre was created in 2001 from an amalgamation of the Centre for Performing Arts (previously located in Grote Street) and the North Adelaide School of Arts (previously located in Stanley Street, North Adelaide). The new building on Light Square was constructed to house the new centre, and opened in March 2001.

Centre for Performing Arts
The Centre for the Performing Arts (CPA) was established in 1978 on the site of the old Adelaide Girls High School, adjacent to the Adelaide Central Market.

Set up by Dr Barry Young, it initially offered courses in dance and technical production. An acting course was introduced in 1986, headed by David Kendall. In 1997 an introductory acting course was established, called Prologue.

North Adelaide School of Arts
The North Adelaide School of Arts (NASA) was established in 1979 on a site vacated the previous year by the South Australian School of Art. (The latter moved to a campus in Underdale.)

NASA was dedicated to practical studio-based studies in visual art, providing training in studio areas, such as Photography and Digital Art, ceramics, sculpture, painting, drawing, printmaking, jewellery and textiles.

Notable alumni
Acting
Kate Kendall, actor, best known for her long-running role as "Angie Piper" in the television series Stingers. (Alumna of the Centre for Performing Arts.)
Nathan Page, actor, currently starring in Miss Fisher's Murder Mysteries
Nathan O'Keefe, actor, a regular performer with both State Theatre Company of South Australia and Windmill Theatre

See also 
 Street art in Adelaide

References

External links 
 TAFE SA - Adelaide College of the Arts (ACARTS)

Australian vocational education and training providers
Performing arts education in Australia
Art schools in Australia
Arts in Adelaide
Educational institutions established in 2001
2001 establishments in Australia